Cleethorpes is a constituency created in 1997, represented in the House of Commons of the UK Parliament since 2010 by Martin Vickers of the Conservative Party.

Political history
Cleethorpes is historically considered as a bellwether seat, having been won by the party that went on to become the largest in the House of Commons at the seven elections contested from and including 1997 (Labour-won in 1997, 2001 and 2005 and Conservative-won in 2010, 2015, 2017 and 2019). However, this status may be under threat in the future, as the Conservatives won by a margin of over 20,000 votes in 2019 - what is considered a safe seat. The seat also swung heavily out of step with the nation as a whole from 2010 onwards, including swinging towards the Conservatives moderately in 2017, an election where Labour made significant gains.

Constituency profile
The seat as it stands since the 2010-implemented boundary reforms forms a broad c-shape as it follows the estuarine south coast of the Humber, ranging from silt to sand along its shore. It is a large part-rural, part-urban seat predominantly on flat alluvial clay in northern Lincolnshire. As well as the eponymous town itself, the constituency includes similarly commercial Barton-upon-Humber and industrial, container ship docks-hosting Immingham, as well as many smaller settlements. It surrounds on three sides the seat of Great Grimsby which covers the town of Grimsby and its short shoreline on the River Humber; its other present neighbours are Brigg & Goole, Gainsborough and Louth & Horncastle seats.

The Labour vote tends to be stronger around Cleethorpes town itself, in the wards of Croft Baker and Sidney Sussex as well as in Immingham, while the Conservative vote is much stronger across Humberston, Waltham, the rural villages and in parts of Barton.

Boundaries

1997–2010: The Borough of North East Lincolnshire wards of Cleethorpes Park, Croft Baker, Haverstoe, Humberston, Immingham, and Wold Parishes, and the Borough of North Lincolnshire wards of Ferry and Wold.

2010–present: The Borough of North East Lincolnshire wards of Croft Baker, Haverstoe, Humberston and New Waltham, Immingham, Sidney Sussex, Waltham, and Wolds, and the Borough of North Lincolnshire wards of Barton and Ferry.

Members of Parliament

Elections

Elections in the 2010s

Elections in the 2000s

Elections in the 1990s

See also
 List of parliamentary constituencies in Humberside

Notes

References

Parliamentary constituencies in Yorkshire and the Humber
Constituencies of the Parliament of the United Kingdom established in 1997
Borough of North Lincolnshire
Borough of North East Lincolnshire
Cleethorpes